The Big Revival is the sixteenth studio album by American country music artist Kenny Chesney. It was released via Blue Chair and Columbia Records on September 23, 2014.

Content
Chesney produced the album with Buddy Cannon, who has produced his other albums starting in 1997 with I Will Stand.

The album produced four singles — "American Kids", "Til It's Gone", "Wild Child", and "Save It for a Rainy Day", all of which reached number one on the U.S. Billboard Country Airplay chart.

The album's title track was previously recorded by John Anderson on his 2001 album Nobody's Got It All, and later by Montgomery Gentry on their 2008 album Back When I Knew It All.

Critical reception

Stephen Thomas Erlewine saying for AllMusic, how "Chesney overhauls his core strengths, winding up with his best record in years." Writing for Rolling Stone, Nick Murray reveals Chesney "continuously brings a sense of musical energy and emotional urgency his previous easygoing albums have sometimes lacked." On behalf of Billboard, Melinda Newman foresees how "The Big Revival serves his faithful flock a generous helping of country salvation with all the breeziness of a long holiday weekend." Glenn Gamboa for Newsday proclaims the album to be "a big-tent collection of future hits that celebrates regular folks who stand up for each other."

Commercial performance
The Big Revival debuted at number one on the US Billboard Top Country Albums chart, becoming Chesney's 13th album to do so, selling 130,000 copies in the United States during its first week. It is also Chesney's 10th consecutive studio album to peak in the Top 3 on the US Billboard 200 chart, debuting at number 2.  As of May 2016, the album has sold 447,000 copies in the United States. On February 13, 2017, the album was certified gold by the Recording Industry Association of America (RIAA) for sales of over 500,000 copies in the United States.

In Canada, the album debuted at number six on the Canadian Albums Chart, selling 4,700 copies in its first week.

Track listing

Personnel

Wyatt Beard – background vocals
Pat Buchanan – acoustic guitar, electric guitar
Tony Castle – synthesizer
Jim Chapman – background vocals
Kenny Chesney – lead vocals
Rodney Clawson – background vocals
Ashley Cleveland – background vocals
Chad Cromwell – drums, percussion
Eric Darken – percussion
Matt Dragstrem – electric guitar, background vocals
Nicolle Galyon – background vocals
Kenny Greenberg – acoustic guitar, electric guitar
Natalie Hemby – background vocals
John Hobbs – Hammond B-3 organ, piano, Wurlitzer
David Huff – programming
Alison Krauss – background vocals
Luke Laird – background vocals
Paul Leim – cajón, drums, percussion
Shane McAnally – background vocals
Randy McCormick – keyboards, synthesizer
Rob McNelley – electric guitar
David Lee Murphy – background vocals
Larry Paxton – bass guitar
Grace Potter – background vocals on "Wild Child"
Danny Rader – banjo, bouzouki, acoustic guitar, electric guitar, mandolin
Michael Rhodes – bass guitar
Mike Rojas – Hammond B-3 organ, Wurlitzer 
John Wesley Ryles – background vocals
F. Reid Shippen – programming 
Jeff Taylor – accordion
Dan Tyminski – acoustic guitar, background vocals
John Willis – acoustic guitar

Charts

Weekly charts

Year-end charts

Singles

Certifications

References

2014 albums
Kenny Chesney albums
Columbia Records albums
Albums produced by Buddy Cannon